Mug is a 2018 Polish  drama film directed by Małgorzata Szumowska. It was selected to compete for the Golden Bear in the main competition section at the 68th Berlin International Film Festival. The film was awarded Jury Grand Prix at the festival.

Synopsis
Since 6 November 2010 in Świebodzin, western Poland, stands the tallest statue of Christ in the world, 36 meters excluding the base. In 2013, a 33-year-old man, victim of a workplace accident, underwent the first face transplant ever performed in Poland. The film merges these two national records of the director's compatriots.

Cast
 Mateusz Kościukiewicz
 Agnieszka Podsiadlik
 Malgorzata Gorol
 Roman Gancarczyk

Reception

Box office
Mug grossed $0 in the United States and Canada and $1 million in other countries.

Critical response
Metacritic reports a normalized score of 70 out of 100, based on 4 critics, indicating "generally favorable reviews".

References

External links
 
 

2018 films
2018 drama films
Polish drama films
2010s Polish-language films
Films directed by Małgorzata Szumowska
Silver Bear Grand Jury Prize winners
Films produced by Anna Wasniewska-Gill